Peter Dell the Elder, or Peter Dell der Ältere, (1490–1552), was a German sculptor.

Dell was born in Würzburg, and is father to another sculptor Peter Dell the Younger. He specialized in religious and portrait sculptures working with limewood and pearwood. Dell also did a number of church monuments out of stone. He died in Würzburg in 1552.

References

1490 births
German sculptors
German male sculptors
1552 deaths